Pousaz is a surname. Notable people with the surname include:
 Guillaume Pousaz (born 1981), Swiss entrepreneur
 Jacques Pousaz (1947–2022), Swiss ice hockey player